Kousha Etessami is a professor of computer science at the University of Edinburgh, Scotland, UK. He has received his Ph.D from the University of Massachusetts Amherst  in 1995. He works on theoretical computer science, in particular on computational complexity theory, game theory and probabilistic systems.

References

External links

Year of birth missing (living people)
Living people
Computer scientists
Academics of the University of Edinburgh
Theoretical computer scientists